Sheikh Nizamul Islam is a Bangladeshi politician and former member of parliament. He was elected from Tangail-1 (Madhupur and Dhanbari) constituency as an Awami League candidate in the third Bangladeshi parliamentary election held on 7 May 1986.

Nizamul was also elected a member of the Provincial Assembly of East Pakistan from Tangail-1 in the 1970 Pakistani general election. During the Liberation War of Bangladesh in 1971, he played an important role in forming foreign public opinion in favor of Provisional Government of Bangladesh.

Early life
Nizamul was born in Barnichanda Bari village of Tangail subdivision, East Pakistan (now Dhanbari Upazila, Tangail District, Bangladesh). He served as president of the Madhupur thana Awami League Branch.

References

Awami League politicians
Living people
3rd Jatiya Sangsad members
People from Tangail District
Year of birth missing (living people)